Hoitorkha is a village, located in Karimganj district in the Indian state of Assam.

References

Villages in Karimganj district